Yanti Somer (born Kirsti Elisa Somersalo, 29 February 1948) is a Finnish actress. She appeared in more than fifteen films since 1970, predominantly in French and Italian productions.

Selected filmography

References

External links 

Interview

1948 births
Living people
Actresses from Helsinki
Finnish film actresses
Finnish expatriates in France
Finnish expatriates in Italy